Naima Lamcharki (born 1943 in Casablanca) is a Moroccan actress.

Awards 
Lamcharki won the prize for Best Female Lead for her performance in A la recherche du mari de ma femme and the 6th National Film Festival in 2001.

In 2021, she won the Best Actress award at Sweden's 11th annual Malmo Arab Film Festival (MAFF) for her role in Mohamed Moftakir's L’automne des pommiers.

Partial filmography

As actress 

 1961: La venganza de Don Mendo
 1963: Casablanca, Nest of Spies
 1977: Blood Wedding
 1982: Les Beaux Jours de Shéhérazade
 1993: A la recherche du mari de ma femme 
 1998: Rue La Caire
 2002: Et après?
 2006: Mauvaise foi
 2010: La grande villa
 2020: L’automne des pommiers

References

External links 
 

1943 births
Living people
Moroccan film actresses